Hanne Staff (born 3 February 1972) is a Norwegian orienteering competitor who has won three individual World Orienteering Championships medals.

She retired from international orienteering at the end of the 2004 season where she became world champion in the middle distance event.

Staff ran for the Norwegian orienteering club Bækkelagets SK in Oslo.

Orienteering World Cup Victories
 Gold, Short Distance, 2000 Australia
 Gold, Classic Distance, 1998 Ireland
 Gold, Classic Distance, 1998 Poland
 Gold, Classic Distance, 1998 Estonia
 Gold, Classic Distance, 1998 Finland
 Gold, Classic Distance, 1996 Lithuania
 Silver, Long Distance, 2002 Switzerland
 Silver, Long Distance, 2002 Sweden
 Silver, Long Distance, 2002 Hungary
 Silver, Short Distance, 1996 Sweden
 Bronze, Long Distance, 2002 Belgium
 Bronze, Sprint Distance, 2002 Switzerland
 Bronze, Long Distance, 2002 Norway
 Bronze, Long Distance, 2002 Czech Republic
 Bronze, Short Distance, 2000 Finland
 Bronze, Long Distance, 2000 Portugal

Orienteering at the World Games
 Gold, Short Distance, 2001 Japan
 Gold, Relay Event, 2001 Japan

References

External links
 
 

1972 births
Living people
People from Nittedal
Norwegian orienteers
Female orienteers
Foot orienteers
World Orienteering Championships medalists
Competitors at the 2001 World Games
World Games gold medalists
World Games medalists in orienteering
Sportspeople from Viken (county)
Junior World Orienteering Championships medalists